Pampilhosa da Serra is a town and a municipality in the Coimbra District, in Portugal. The population in 2011 was 4,481, in an area of 396.46 km².

Parishes
Administratively, the municipality is divided into 8 civil parishes (freguesias):
 Cabril
 Dornelas do Zêzere
 Fajão - Vidual
 Janeiro de Baixo
 Pampilhosa da Serra
 Pessegueiro
 Portela do Fojo - Machio
 Unhais-o-Velho

Notable people 
 António Fernandes (born 1962 in Pampilhosa da Serra) a chess player, became Grandmaster in 2003
 Tony Carreira (born 1963 in Armadouro) a Portuguese musician.

References

Municipalities of Coimbra District
People from Pampilhosa da Serra